Margarita Stefanova Popova (born 15 May 1957) is Bulgarian jurist, prosecutor, educator who was Vice President of Bulgaria from 2012 to 2017. She previously served as Minister of Justice from 27 July 2009 to 4 September 2011 in the cabinet of Boyko Borisov. As the running mate of presidential candidate Rosen Plevneliev in the October 2011 presidential election, she was elected as Vice President and took office in January 2012.

Biography 
Margarita Popova graduated Bulgarian philology in University of Sofia in 1980, and later (1989) law in the same university. She was appointed prosecutor in Pirdop in 1990, in 1991 she was a regional prosecutor in Ruse, and administrative head and regional prosecutor in Sofia district from 1996 to 2006. She studied law under communism and is an expert on communist law. She carries on her expertise on communist law in her work as vice-president.

She was lecturer in the National Police Academy (2001–2004) and National Institute of Justice (2005–2009).

References 

1957 births
Living people
People from Velingrad
Government ministers of Bulgaria
Bulgarian prosecutors
Vice presidents of Bulgaria
Women government ministers of Bulgaria
Women vice presidents
Female justice ministers
Justice ministers of Bulgaria
21st-century Bulgarian women politicians
21st-century Bulgarian politicians